The 1946 Greater Berlin City Council election (Stadtverordnetenversammlung von Groß-Berlin) was held on 20 October 1946 to elect all 130 members of the City Council. It was the only all-Berlin election in the period between the end of the Second World War and German reunification in 1990.

The clear winner of the election was the Social Democratic Party (SPD) led by Otto Ostrowski, which won 48.7% and 63 seats, just three short of a majority. The Christian Democratic Union finished in second place under Ferdinand Friedensburg with 22.2% of votes and 29 seats. The Socialist Unity Party (SED), formed a few months earlier as a merger of the Communist Party and the SPD branches in the Soviet zone, took just 19.8% of the vote and 26 seats. The remaining 9.3% of the votes went to the Liberal Democratic Party (LDP) which received 12 seats.

Voter turnout was 92.3%. The result was a clear rejection of the Socialist Unity Party, which was favored by the Soviet occupation authority, and of the CDU, which came to dominate politics in West Germany.

SPD leader Ostrowski was elected mayor by the City Council in December and formed a cabinet comprising all four parties. However, rising hostility between the SPD and SED saw him come under pressure to dismiss the SED members of the ministry. When he refused, the SPD put forward a motion of no confidence in the city council, which narrowly fell short of the two-thirds majority required to pass. However Ostrowski's position was untenable and he resigned a few days later on 17 April. He was replaced by Ernst Reuter, who took a strongly anti-SED and anti-Soviet stance. As a result, the Soviet authorities refused to consent to his appointment and Louise Schroder became acting mayor. In 1948, the eastern district and Soviet authorities withdrew from the city council and government, de facto dividing the city.

Results

External links
 Wahlen Berlin
 Deutsches Rundfunkarchiv
 Bundeszentrale für politische Bildung

Elections in Berlin
Berlin